Outre-Mer is an 1830s prose collection by American poet Henry Wadsworth Longfellow.

Outre-Mer may also refer to:
 Outre Mer, a 2005 album by Garage A Trois
 Outre-Mers (journal), a French journal
 Overseas France, the French-administered territories outside Europe
 The 12th-century Crusader states, also called Outremer
 The French catamaran manufacturer Outremer; see Marc Van Peteghem

See also
 
 Outré (disambiguation)